The Nadym is a river in Yamalo-Nenets Autonomous Okrug, Russia.

It is known for having a very rickety pontoon bridge for summer use while winter roads go over the ice. A new fixed bridge for combined road and rail use is to be finished by the end of 2015.

Course
The river originates in Lake Numto, in the Siberian Uvaly and flows into the Kara Sea through the Gulf of Ob. Its mouth is very near to the mouth of the Ob. It freezes up in October and stays under the ice until late May. The Levaya Khetta is one of the biggest tributaries of the Nadym. The town of Nadym is located on the river Nadym.

References

Rivers of Yamalo-Nenets Autonomous Okrug
Drainage basins of the Kara Sea